Arauca can refer to:

Arauca Department, in the northeastern part of Colombia
Arauca, Arauca, capital of the Arauca Department in Colombia
Arauca River, a river shared by Colombia and Venezuela